Endview Plantation (Harwood Plantation) is an 18th-century plantation which is located on Virginia State Route 238 in the Lee Hall community in the northwestern area of the independent city of Newport News, Virginia.

History
Earlier known as the Harwood Plantation, the house was built in 1769 by William Harwood along the Great Warwick Road, which linked the colonial capital of Williamsburg with the town of Hampton on the harbor of Hampton Roads. The house and grounds were used by military forces during the Revolutionary War. General Thomas Nelson, Jr.'s Virginia Militia used it as a resting place on September 28, 1781, en route to Yorktown shortly before the surrender of the British troops under Lord Cornwallis.

Military use again came during the American Civil War, when the building was occupied by Dr. Humphrey Harwood Curtis, Jr., one of two doctors in Warwick County, Virginia. Endview was briefly used as a field hospital by the Confederacy during the 1862 Battle of Dam Number One (part of the Peninsula Campaign).

Endview was acquired by the City of Newport News in 1995.  The post Civil War addition to the house was torn down, and the lost chimney rebuild so as to make the building reach its 1860 appearance.  The site is now officially known as "The Civil War at Endview: A Living History Museum". It is primarily a House Museum, with visitors touring the four interior rooms, which portray a collection of medical supplies, a standard parlor, Union soldier gear, and a bedroom.  Living Historians are only present at special events.

The property has been used for once-a-year Civil War Reenactments, and has recently restarted reenactments of the Siege of Yorktown on a bi-annual basis. As of Summer 2010, operating hours have been cut back so that the site is closed to the public Tuesday and Wednesday, with additional closings in the Winter.

Media
Endview Plantation was featured on Only in America with Larry the Cable Guy in the episode "America After Dark". Self-proclaimed "redneck" comedian Larry the Cable Guy visited the plantation with Southeast Virginia Paranormal Investigations, a local paranormal team and joined them in investigating the house. The group could not declare the house haunted however, they did gather evidence of possible paranormal activity, such as EVP's of several strange noises and ghost voices on their digital recorders.

References

External links

Endview Plantation website

Houses completed in 1769
Houses on the National Register of Historic Places in Virginia
Virginia municipal and county parks
Houses in Newport News, Virginia
Plantation houses in Virginia
Historic house museums in Virginia
Museums in Newport News, Virginia
American Civil War museums in Virginia
Georgian architecture in Virginia
Parks in Newport News, Virginia
National Register of Historic Places in Newport News, Virginia